Do You Dreams Come True? is Dreams Come True's fifteenth studio album. It was released on March 21, 2009, which coincides with the release of their debut single in 1989. It was released in three formats: Regular edition (CD only), limited edition A (2CDs) and limited edition B (CD+DVD). The album reached the top spot on the weekly albums chart despite having been on sale for only four days, giving them their twelfth number-one album and setting the record for most number-one albums by a female vocal group; putting them ahead of the late Zard and Every Little Thing. On its third week the album rose back to number one, their first album in fourteen years to do so.

The album was certified Triple Platinum for shipment of 750,000 copies. It is also the first DCT album to be released under Nayutawave Records, a sub-label of Universal Music Japan.

Track list

Charts

Oricon Sales Chart

Physical Sales & Rank

References

2009 albums
Dreams Come True (band) albums
Japanese-language albums